The Basilica della Santissima Trinità di Saccargia (English: "Basilica of the Holy Trinity of Saccargia") is a church in the comune of Codrongianos, northern Sardinia, Italy. It is one of the most important Romanesque site in the island. The construction is entirely in local stone (black basalt and white limestone), with a typical appearance of Tuscan Romanesque style.

History
The church was finished in 1116 over the ruins of a pre-existing monastery, and consecrated on October 5 of the same year. Its construction was ordered by the giudice (judge) of Torres. It was entrusted to Camaldolese monks who here founded an abbey. It was later enlarged in Pisane style, including the addition of the tall bell tower. The portico on the façade is also probably a late addition, and is attributed to workers from Lucca.

The church was abandoned in the 16th century, until it was restored and reopened in the early 20th century.

References

External links

Exibart 

12th-century Roman Catholic church buildings in Italy
Basilica churches in Sardinia
Churches in the province of Sassari
Romanesque architecture in Sardinia